Peter Urban Bruun Gad (12 February 1879 – 26 December 1947) was a Danish film director, stage actor, screenwriter, and author. He directed 40 films between 1910 and 1927. His wife Asta Nielsen starred in 30 of his films, also in his début the film Afgrunden (The Abyss) from 1910. They moved to Germany in 1911 where Gad worked with Paul Davidson until 1922.

His mother was the playwright Emma Gad.  In 1873, the painter Paul Gauguin married his father's cousin, Mette-Sophie Gad. Between 1912 and 1918, Gad was married to actress Asta Nielsen.

His films include a German-language adaptation of Gerhart Hauptmann's play The Assumption of Hannele, which Gad directed in 1922.

Filmography

En rekrut fra 64
The Abyss (Afgrunden)  (1910)
Heißes Blut (1911)
The Moth (Nachtfalter)  (1911)
Den sorte drøm (1911)
Im großen Augenblick  (1911)
Zigeunerblut (1911)
Der fremde Vogel (1911)
Dyrekøbt glimmer
The Traitress (Die Verräterin) (1911)
Den store flyver
Die Macht des Goldes (1912)
Poor Jenny (Die arme Jenny) (1912)
Zu Tode gehetzt (1912)
Der Totentanz (1912)
Die Kinder des Generals (1912)
Wenn die Maske fällt (1912)
Det berygtede Hus
A Romany Spy (Das Mädchen ohne Vaterland) (1912)
Behind Comedy's Mask (Komödianten)  (1913)
Jugend und Tollheit (1913)
Die Sünden der Väter (1913)
Der Tod in Sevilla (1913)
Die Suffragette (1913)
S 1 (1913)
The Film Primadonna (Die Filmprimadonna) (1913)
Engelein - Mimisches Lustspiel (1913)
Emma og Urban Gad i hjemmet (1913)
Engelein (1914)
Das Kind ruft (1914)
Zapata's Gang (Zapatas Bande) (1914)
Das Feuer (1914)
Standrechtlich erschossen (1914)
Das Feuer. Die alte Gnädige (1914)
Vordertreppe - Hintertreppe (1915)
Die Tochter der Landstraße (1915)
Die falsche Asta Nielsen (1915)
Die ewige Nacht (1915)
Engeleins Hochzeit (1916)
Die weißen Rosen (1916)
Cinderella (Aschenbrödel) (1916)
Der rote Streifen (1916)
Der breite Weg (1917)
Die verschlossene Tür (1917)
Klosterfriede (1917)
Die Vergangenheit rächt sich (1917)
Die Gespensterstunde (1917)
Vera Panina (1918)
Die neue Daliah (1918)
Die Kleptomanin (1918)
Der schuldlose Verdacht (1918)
Der Schmuck des Rajah (1918)
Das verhängnisvolle Andenken (1918)
Das sterbende Modell (1918)
Das Spiel von Liebe und Tod (1919)
 Christian Wahnschaffe (1920)
What a Girl (1920)
Der Abgrund der Seelen (1920)
Ich bin Du (1921)
Mein Mann - Der Nachtredakteur (1921)
 The Love Corridor (1921)
 The Poisoned Stream (1921)
 The Island of the Lost (1921)
Hannele's Journey to Heaven (1922)
Graf Festenberg (1922)
Lykkehjulet (1926)

External links

References

1879 births
1947 deaths
Danish film directors
Silent film directors
Danish male stage actors
20th-century Danish male actors
Danish male screenwriters
People from Korsør